The Pohl trial against the Nazi German administration of the "Final Solution" (also known as the WVHA Trial and officially The United States of America vs. Oswald Pohl, et al) was the fourth of the thirteen trials for war crimes that the United States authorities held in their occupation zone in Germany in Nuremberg after the end of World War II. The thirteen trials were all held before U.S. military courts, not before the International Military Tribunal, although both courts presided in the same rooms at the Palace of Justice. They are known collectively as the "Subsequent Nuremberg Trials" or more formally, as the "Trials of War Criminals before the Nuremberg Military Tribunals" (NMT).

In the Pohl case, SS-Obergruppenführer Oswald Pohl and 17 other SS officers employed by the SS Main Economic and Administrative Office (abbreviated in German as SS-WVHA), were tried for war crimes and crimes against humanity committed during the time of the Nazi regime. The main charge against them was their active involvement in and administration of the so-called "Final Solution". The WVHA was the Nazi government office that ran the concentration and extermination camps. It also handled the procurement for the Waffen-SS and, as of 1942, the administration of the SS-Totenkopfverbände.

The judges in this case, heard before Military Tribunal II, were Robert M. Toms (presiding judge), Fitzroy Donald Phillips, Michael A. Musmanno, and John J. Speight as an alternate judge. The Chief of Counsel for the Prosecution was Telford Taylor; James M. McHaney and Jack W. Robbins were the principal prosecutors. The indictment was presented on January 13, 1947; the trial began on April 8, and sentences were handed down on November 3, 1947. Four people, including Oswald Pohl, were sentenced to death by hanging. Three were acquitted. The others received sentences of imprisonment between 10 years and lifetime.

At the request of the judges, the court reconvened on July 14, 1948, to consider additional material presented by the defense. On August 11, 1948, the tribunal issued its final sentences, confirming most of its earlier sentences, but slightly reducing some of the prison sentences and changing the death sentence of Georg Lörner into a sentence of life imprisonment.

Indictment
The indictment presented by a grand jury charged the defendants with the following. 
 Participating in a common plan or conspiracy to commit war crimes and crimes against humanity.
 War crimes through the administration of concentration camps and extermination camps, and the mass murders and atrocities committed there.
 Crimes against humanity on the same grounds, including slave labor charges.
 Membership in a criminal organization, the SS. Note: The SS had been found a criminal organization previously by the IMT. 

All defendants were charged on all counts of the indictment, except Hohberg, who was not charged on count 4. Charge 1 (conspiracy) was largely disregarded by the tribunal and no judgments on this count were passed.

Defendants 
All convicts were found guilty on charges 2, 3, and 4, except Hohberg (who was not charged on count 4, but found guilty on counts 2 and 3). Three defendants were acquitted on all charges: Vogt, Scheide, and Klein.

Hohberg's sentence of 10 years included time already served—he was imprisoned on October 22, 1945—because he was not a member of the SS. The defense counsel for Karl Sommer filed a petition to modify the sentence to General Lucius D. Clay, the Commander-in-Chief for the U.S. occupation zone. In response to this appeal, Clay ordered Sommer's death sentence to be commuted into a lifetime imprisonment on May 11, 1949. Pohl kept proclaiming his innocence, saying he had been only a lower functionary. He was hanged on June 7, 1951, at Landsberg Prison.

The head of Amt D: Konzentrationslagerwesen of the WVHA (the department of concentration camps), Richard Glücks, who had been the direct superior of all commanders of concentration camps and as such directly responsible for all the atrocities committed there, was not tried. On May 10, 1945, two days after the unconditional surrender of Germany, he had committed suicide in the navy hospital of Flensburg.

See also
August Frank memorandum
Deutsche Wirtschaftsbetriebe

 DEST
 Nuremberg trials

References

External links
Pohl et al. : US Military Tribunal Nuremberg, Judgement of 3 November 1947 (PDF)

United States Nuremberg Military Tribunals
Holocaust trials
1947 in Germany
1948 in Germany